You Deserve Someone Better Than a Bum Like Me is an EP released by Swedish singer-songwriter Jens Lekman in May 2005 on his Australian tour.

Track listing
"I Don't Know If She's Worth 900 Kr"
"The One Dollar Thought"
"La strada nel bosco" (Cesare Andrea Bixio)
"Tammy" (Jay Livingston, Ray Evans)

2005 EPs
Jens Lekman EPs